The women's 4 × 400 metres event at the 2015 Asian Athletics Championships was held on June 7.

Results

References

Relay
Relays at the Asian Athletics Championships
2015 in women's athletics